The red mouse opossum (Marmosa rubra) is a South American marsupial of the family Didelphidae. Its range includes eastern Ecuador and Peru.

References

Opossums
Mammals described in 1931